The 1983 World's Strongest Man was the seventh edition of World's Strongest Man and was won by Geoff Capes from the United Kingdom. It was his first title. Jón Páll Sigmarsson from the Iceland finished second, and Simon Wulfse from the Netherlands third. The winner of the three previous competetitions, Bill Kazmaier, was not invited to compete again in this year. The contest was held at Christchurch, New Zealand. The title of the competition, formerly "World's Strongest Men", was changed to the current title for this competition.

Events
There were a total of 8 different events used in the competition:
 Fergus Walk (Farmer's Walk 175 lb. logs for distance in 90 s) – Winner JP Sigmarsson
 Steel bar bend – Winner Simon Wulfse (only one to bend 15mm to 8inch distance)
 Cheese Deadlift (18" off the floor with straps allowed) Winner Tom Magee 1180 lbs
 Truck Pull (10 tons over 35m) – Winner Geoff Capes 43s. The original tractor was replaced because no contestant could move it.
 Natural Stone Overhead Press – Winner John Gamble 126 kg
 Weight Toss (56 lbs weight over bar throw) – Winner Geoff Capes 15'6"
 Wool Bale Hoist (250 lbs) – Winner JP Sigmarsson 9'10.5"
 Sack Load (10 sacks each 168 lbs.) – Winner JP Sigmarsson 1:31.7

Final results

References

External links
 Official site

World's Strongest
World's Strongest Man
World's strongest man
Sport in Christchurch